Valdemar Henriksson (18 July 1884 – 17 February 1929) was a Finnish rowing coxswain. He competed in the men's coxed four event at the 1912 Summer Olympics.

References

External links
 

1884 births
1929 deaths
Finnish male rowers
Olympic rowers of Finland
Rowers at the 1912 Summer Olympics
Rowers from Saint Petersburg
Coxswains (rowing)